Robert Leander Collyard (born October 16, 1949) is an American former professional ice hockey center who played in the National Hockey League (NHL) for the St. Louis Blues during the  season. After the season, he was selected by the Washington Capitals in the 1974 NHL Expansion Draft with the 30th pick in the draft, but he never played for Washington.

Awards and honors

CHL Second All-Star Team (1972–73)
NAHL Second All-Star Team (1974–75, 1975–76, 1976–77)

References

External links

1949 births
American men's ice hockey centers
Colorado College Tigers men's ice hockey players
Denver Spurs players
Fort Worth Wings players
Ice hockey players from Minnesota
Sportspeople from Hibbing, Minnesota
Kalamazoo Wings (1974–2000) players
Kansas City Blues players
Living people
Milwaukee Admirals (IHL) players
Philadelphia Firebirds (AHL) players
Philadelphia Firebirds (NAHL) players
St. Louis Blues draft picks
St. Louis Blues players
AHCA Division I men's ice hockey All-Americans